From the Wood is the debut album of Pat McGee, who later formed the Pat McGee Band.  It was released independently in 1995. There are two versions that exist, both containing 9 songs. The original release in spring of 1995 includes cover versions of Crosby, Stills & Nash's "Southern Cross" and the BoDeans' "Still the Night" as tracks 8 and 9.

Track listing 
"Girl From Athens" – 4:49
"Pride" –  4:01
"Rebecca"  – 5:15
"Haven't Seen For a While"  – 5:05
"Could Have Been a Song" –  4:10
"The Story"  – 4:37
"Identity"  – 3:25
"Nobody Knows"  – 4:36
"Who Stole Her From Heaven"  – 3:36

Personnel 
Pat McGee – guitar, vocals, producer
Hugh McGee – backing vocals
Julie Murphy – backing vocals
Mike Clem – bass
John Small – bass
Chris Bashista – drums, percussion
Eddie Hartness – drums, percussion
Travis Allison – piano

References

1995 debut albums
Pat McGee Band albums